The Manila Chronicle was a newspaper in the Philippines founded in 1945. Its founding newspapermen sold it to Eugenio López, Sr. It was closed down when martial law was imposed by Ferdinand Marcos in 1972. It was published daily by the Manila Chronicle Publishing Corporation, with Rodrigo Apoderado as chief editor. It was re-opened in 1986 but was closed down in 1998 after a labor dispute.

See also 
 Manila Chronicle building

References

English-language newspapers published in the Philippines
Newspapers established in 1945
National newspapers published in the Philippines
Newspapers published in Metro Manila
Defunct newspapers published in the Philippines
Defunct daily newspapers
Daily newspapers published in the Philippines
Publications disestablished in 1998